Kutukuluru is an Indian village in Anaparthy mandal of East Godavari district, Andhra Pradesh.

References

Villages in Anaparthy mandal